The Men's 50 km Walk at the 1999 World Championships in Sevilla, Spain was held on Wednesday August 25, 1999, with the start at 07:45h local time

The first person to cross the finish line was Russian German Skurygin.  Unlike the other DQ's listed for form violations (loss of contact or bent knee), his was announced two years later.  He was disqualified for a doping violation, one of the first for a string of doping violations by athletes in the charge of his coach Viktor Chegin.  Skurygin was removed from the results all athletes behind him advancing one place.  Skurygin died of a heart attack 9 years later at age 45.

Medalists

Abbreviations
All times shown are in hours:minutes:seconds

Startlist

Intermediates

Final ranking

See also
 1999 Race Walking Year Ranking

References

 Results
 trackandfieldnews

W
Racewalking at the World Athletics Championships